Green Packet is an international technology company that was founded in Cupertino, California in 2000 and listed on the Malaysian Stock Exchange in 2005. In 2007, Green Packet crossed 1 billion US dollars in market capitalization. Today, Green Packet designs and produces wireless devices, user-centric applications and services. Its core businesses are Solution (cellular devices), Communication (voice minutes and data), and Digital Services (fintech and proptech). Its headquarters are in Petaling Jaya, Malaysia, with branch offices in China, Singapore, Hong Kong and Taiwan.

Products and services
Green Packet's businesses are anchored in five key segments: Solutions, Communications, FinTech, PropTech and Digital Services (Cloud Technology, Internet of Things and Artificial Intelligence).

Subsidiary
In August 2008, Green Packet created Packet One Networks, the first WiMAX service provider in Malaysia.

References

Malaysian brands
Software companies of Malaysia
Telecommunications equipment vendors
Telecommunications companies established in 2000
Malaysian companies established in 2000
2000 establishments in California
Companies formerly listed on MESDAQ
Companies listed on Bursa Malaysia